Art of War Undisputed Arena Fighting Championship: Art of War 4 was the fourth mixed martial arts event by the mixed martial arts organization Art of War Undisputed Arena Fighting Championship. The event took place on Saturday, October 27, 2007 at the Grand Casino Tunica in Tunica, Mississippi.  The card was distributed by American Television Distribution.

History 
The fight card included Mike Wessel and Matt Thomas in the main event. The show also featured a bout between Shane Carwin and Rex Richards. This was the first Art of War Undisputed Arena Fighting Championship outside of Texas and that did not air on AXS TV formally HDNet.

Results

References 

2007 in mixed martial arts
Mixed martial arts events
Mixed martial arts in Mississippi